Treaty Sarsfields was a Gaelic Athletic Association (GAA) club based in the Thomondgate area on the Northside of Limerick city, Ireland. The club participated in competitions organised by Limerick GAA county board.